Lior Ashkenazi (born 28 December 1968) is an Israeli actor, voice actor, comedian and television presenter.

Biography
Lior Ashkenazi was born in Ramat Gan, Israel, and grew up in the Neveh Yehoshua neighborhood. His parents are Sephardic Jews from Turkey who immigrated to Israel in 1964. His father, Shmuel, worked as a printer. His mother, Victoria, was a housewife. His parents spoke Ladino at home, and it was his first language. At the age of 16, in the wake of problems in school, he moved to Kibbutz Regavim.

Ashkenazi served as a paratrooper in the Israel Defense Forces, and was stationed in the Israeli-occupied West Bank during the First Intifada.

Ashkenazi was first married to Israeli actress Shira Farber, with whom he had his first daughter. After his divorce, he had a relationship with Israeli playwright and screenwriter Sigal Avin. In December 2011, he married Israeli producer Maya Amsellem. They had a daughter in August 2012.

Acting and film career 
He studied acting at Beit Zvi. After graduating in 1994, he worked for Habima and Beersheba Theater. He starred in many plays at Beit Lessin Theater under the direction of Zipi Pines, one of his teachers at Beit Zvi. He also appeared with the Cameri Theater in Tel Aviv, although Beit Lessin remained his home base. His breakout role came in Late Marriage alongside Ronit Elkabetz in 2001.

In 2016 he appeared alongside Richard Gere in the political drama, Norman: The Moderate Rise and Tragic Fall of a New York Fixer. Ashkenazi won an Ophir Award for Best Lead Actor for his performance in  the 2017 film, Foxtrot, Israel's entry for the Best Foreign Language Film at the 90th Academy Awards.

In November 2018 Ashkenazi appeared in Shakespeare's The Tempest, a joint production between the Old Globe Theatre and the Los Angeles Philharmonic.

In 2019 Ashkenazi appeared in HBO's show Our Boys, an American-Israeli series.

Ashkenazi is also a Hebrew-language dubber. He dubbed Li Shang in the 1998 Disney film Mulan and the 2005 sequel as well as the title character in Bolt.

Filmography

Film

Television

Awards and nominations

References

External links 

 
 

1968 births
Living people
People from Ramat Gan
Beit Zvi School for the Performing Arts alumni
Israeli male film actors
Israeli male voice actors
Israeli male television actors
Israeli male stage actors
Israeli male comedians
Israeli television presenters
Jewish Israeli male actors
Jewish Israeli comedians
20th-century Israeli male actors
21st-century Israeli male actors
20th-century Israeli comedians
21st-century Israeli comedians
Israeli people of Turkish-Jewish descent
Israeli Sephardi Jews
Israeli Mizrahi Jews